Patrick Rampillon (born 4 July 1955, in Bressuire) is a retired French football player who played for SO Cholet, Stade Reims, AS Saint-Étienne and Rennes.

After retiring as a player, Rampillon enjoyed a career as a coach at Rennes youth academy. He managed the first team in 1987, then became the academy's director.

References

External links

1955 births
Living people
French footballers
Stade de Reims players
AS Saint-Étienne players
Stade Rennais F.C. players
Ligue 1 players
Ligue 2 players
French football managers
SO Cholet players

Association football midfielders